Jadestone Group was a video game developer based in Stockholm, Sweden. It specialised in mobile and online games and was best known for Championship Manager Online (or CM-Online) alongside partner Eidos Interactive. On February 2, 2010, Jadestone Group announced Championship Manager Online would close on April 30, 2010 and that the decision was made by the games' owners Eidos Interactive.

Selected games
 E-sports series - Windows
 DiceArena - online
 GamArena - online
 Kodo - Mobile
 Sea O'Fortune - Mobile
 Spirits - Nokia N-Gage
 Dirk Dagger and the Fallen Idol - N-Gage 2.0
 CM-Online - online
 Zeebo Family Pack - Zeebo

References

External links 
 Jadestone corporate website
 Jadestone Group profile from MobyGames

Companies based in Stockholm
Defunct video game companies of Sweden
Video game development companies